Citrus Hill High School is a secondary public co-ed school serving students of Moreno Valley, Perris and Riverside in the Val Verde Unified School District.

History
Citrus Hill High School opened on August 18, 2005 with 651 enrollees grades 9-10. Citrus Hill High School (CHHS) is located on 60 acres in the unincorporated area of Perris in the County of Riverside, approximately nine miles southwest of Moreno Valley and three miles southeast of Riverside. The community in which CHHS has located consists of a primarily rural, residential community with some commercial and retail service businesses. The immediate area consists of single family homes and ranch style properties. The school name refers to the former orange groves. The school now serves approximately 1,800 students. Students' families are largely nuclear families in the lower to the middle socio-economic range. The most recent demographic data shows Citrus Hill High School has an ethnically-diverse population, with 88% of its students being Hispanic, 4% being Black, 1% being Asian, 0.1% being Native Hawaiian/Pacific Islander, 3% being white, 0.2% being Native American/Alaskan, and 1% being mixed race.

Campus
Citrus Hill students begin their day at 8:30 a.m., complete with six (possibly seven) periods of instruction, and end their day at 3:45 or 4:50 p.m. (end time for the seventh period). The school year is divided into two 18-week semesters. Successful completion of each course earns five credits per semester. Academic class size has a maximum enrollment of 33 students per class or a maximum of 165 students per day. Citrus Hill High School provides students with a variety of co-curricular and extra-curricular activities. Currently, there are nearly two dozen academic support/co-curricular clubs active on camps along with sixteen cultural and service clubs which provide students with a large selection of choices for extra curricular activities. In addition, there are sixteen competitive athletic teams, many with three levels of participation. Citrus Hill High School is staffed with full-time Activities and an Athletic Director to provide support for these programs and to provide a stronger school connectedness and participation among the student body. Currently 25% of students participate in a co-curricular class/activity and 21% participate in athletics.

Activities and organizations
Previously, the Link Crew program served to train and support upperclassmen mentors for the ninth grade classes. Most ninth grade advisory classes would have two Link Crew members for a class of 20-25 students. Link Crew leaders had to qualify for the program by maintaining a grade point average of at least 2.5.  

The Associated Student Body is in charge of all social activities for the student body. There are student representatives from all grade levels. In order to qualify for ASB, students must maintain a 2.0 grade point average. The program is open to any student who qualifies. ASB has elected-officer positions for the school as a whole and for each grade level. Students are elected to these positions by their grade-level peers and help to facilitate meetings. Excessive discipline issues or not meeting the required GPA serve as cause for removal from the program. ASB used to publish a Daily Bulletin that is broadcast daily to all 2nd period classes to announce upcoming events and requirements. In the past, there was a school-wide unity day that focused on cultural diversity and teacher-to-student relationship building, and it occurred once a month. On those Fridays, teachers and students would attend performances from various school groups during the advisory period. 

The choral program is an elective program. The three levels of choir offered are; Beginning Choir, Jazz Choir, and Chamber Singers. Chamber Singers meets the University of California and California State University's A-G subject requirements. All groups are performing groups; however, Jazz Choir and especially Chamber Singers compete extensively with other high school choral groups.

Citrus Hill's drama department regularly produces two full productions a year. Once a year, there is a musical uniting effort with band and choir. There are additional showcase performances where students are able to do their class projects for a larger community.

The art program features an annual show where students are able to share selected works with the campus community.

The Talon is the yearbook of Citrus Hill High School.

The journalism program used to produce a newspaper named the Talon Times or the Soaring Eye. 

The CHHS band program consists of various performance ensembles including Marching Band, Concert Band, Winter Drumline, Percussion Ensemble and the yearly musical performance with the Drama and Choir Departments.

Athletics 
The school's athletic teams compete in the CIF Southern Section in the Mountain Pass League. Teams are fielded in baseball, basketball, cross country, football, soccer, softball, swimming, track, volleyball, and wrestling. The teams have won several league championship titles and the football team has won five division championships in addition to holding an Inland Empire record for a 38-game win streak (2007–2009).

Southern Section Division Titles (CIF)

Football 

2007 (14-0)

2008 (14-0)

2012 (14-0)

2013 (13-1)

2015 CIF State Champions (15-2)

Boys Soccer 

2010-11 

2016-17 (23-5-2)

Boys Wrestling
2017-18

References

External links
Citrus Hill High School
Citrus Hill High School Band and Color Guard Website

Educational institutions established in 2005
High schools in Riverside County, California
Public high schools in California
2005 establishments in California